John Myddelton (1685 – 9 April 1747), of Chirk Castle, Denbighshire, was a Welsh landowner and politician.

He was born the younger son of Richard Myddelton of Shrewsbury and inherited his father's estates, including Chirk Castle, when his elder brother Robert died young and unmarried in 1733.

He was elected Member of Parliament (MP) of the Parliament of Great Britain for Denbigh Boroughs on 27 April 1733 – 1741 and Denbighshire in 1741 – 23 February 1742.

He died in 1747. He had married Mary, the daughter of Thomas Liddell of Bedford Row, London, with whom he had 2 sons and  2 daughters and was succeeded by his eldest son, Richard, also an MP for Denbigh.

References

1685 births
1747 deaths
John
British MPs 1727–1734
British MPs 1734–1741
British MPs 1741–1747
Members of the Parliament of Great Britain for Denbighshire
Members of the Parliament of Great Britain for Denbigh Boroughs